Ruppertstein Castle is the ruins of a hill castle located at an elevation of  near the village of Lemberg in the collective municipality of Pirmasens-Land in the county of Südwestpfalz in the German state of Rhineland-Palatinate. It is situated on top of the Ruppertstein hill south of the village of Ruppertsweiler.

History 
Little is known of the castle, which was probably built in the 13th century. Its history began in 1198 with the purchase by Henry I, Count of Zweibrücken, of the hill on which it was built. It was either destroyed in 1525 during the Palatine Peasants' War or had been allowed to fall into ruins by then.

Around 1900 a stone stairway was built on the rocks in order to reach the terrace of the rock on which the castle stood, in order to use it as a viewing point. This stone stairway was refurbished in 2007 by the Pirmasens-Land municipal authorities. A wooden stairway may originally have been used to access the castle.

References

Literature 
 
 Emil Heuser: Neuer Pfalzführer. Ludwigshafen am Rhein, 1951

External links 
 Ruppertstein Castle at Burg-Lemberg.de
 Photos of Ruppertstein Castle at Burgenparadies.de
 Palatine Castle Lexicon: Ruppertstein Castle

Castles in Rhineland-Palatinate
Buildings and structures in Südwestpfalz